The Uganda Revenue Authority (URA) is a government revenue collection agency established by the Parliament of Uganda. Operating under the Ministry of Finance, Planning and Economic Development, the URA is responsible for enforcing, assessing, collecting, and accounting for the various taxes imposed in Uganda.

Location
URA's headquarters is located in a 22-storey skyscraper, known as Uganda Revenue Authority House (URA Tower), located at Plot M 193/4 Kinnawataka Road, Nakawa Industrial Area, in the Nakawa Division of the city of Kampala, Uganda's capital and largest city. The coordinates of the agency's headquarters are 0°19'48.0"N 32°37'10.0"E (Latitude:0.330000; Longitude:32.619444).

History

Allen Kagina was charged with eliminating corruption in the URA when she was appointed Commissioner General in 2004. Minister of Information Rose Namayanja said, "Under the leadership of Ms Allen Kagina, we have successfully cleaned URA and tax collections on a year-to-year basis have gone up. The situation is not as bad as it used to be." According to the Daily Monitor, this view was shared by the president of Uganda.

Overview
In 1991, when URA was established, tax collection was 6.83% of GDP, amounting to UGX:133 billion. In 2015, taxes collected were 13% of GDP, amounting to UGX:11.2 trillion. URA targets to increase tax collection to at least 16% of GDP by 2020.

Administration
On 29th March 2020, the President of the Republic of Uganda H.E. Gen. Yoweri Kaguta Museveni appointed John Musinguzi Rujoki as Commissioner General. He replaced lawyer Doris Akol who was appointed on 27 October 2014 by then Ugandan Finance Minister Maria Kiwanuka.   Allen Kagina who served at the helm of the URA for two consecutive five-year terms  prior to Doris before retiring.  To accommodate the majority of its staff in one location, URA built a 22-storey tower adjacent to its headquarters at Nakawa, completed in 2018, and officially commissioned in January 2019.

Commissioner Generals
The table below illustrates the Commissioner Generals of the authority since its inception in 1991.

Board of directors
The government agency is supervised by a seven-person board of directors, who are appointed by the Ugandan minister of finance. As of June 2020, the table below illustrates the composition of the URA Board of Directors.

See also
URA House
Economy of Uganda
Ministry of Finance, Planning and Economic Development (Uganda)

References

External links 
Uganda Revenue Authority Website
Shs195 billion paint deal led to URA shake-up As at 1 June 2020.

Government agencies of Uganda
Economy of Uganda
Revenue services
Government agencies established in 1991
Organisations based in Kampala
1991 establishments in Uganda
Taxation in Uganda